"Love alone will stay" is a poem by Caroline Alice Elgar, set to music for voice and piano by her husband, the English composer Edward Elgar, in 1897.

The song was first published in the cultural magazine The Dome –  "a Quarterly containing Examples of All the Arts".  It is artistically scripted in Elgar's own hand, and signed and dated “12.IX.97.”

Elgar later included a revised version of the poem as the second song, renamed "In Haven", in his song-cycle for voice and orchestra "Sea Pictures".

Lyrics

References
 The Dome, No. 4 (London, The Unicorn Press, New Year's Day 1898)
 Kennedy, Michael, Portrait of Elgar (Oxford University Press, Third ed., 1987) 
 Moore, Jerrold N. Edward Elgar: A Creative Life (Oxford University Press, 1984)

External links

Notes

Songs by Edward Elgar
1897 songs
English poems